Alberto César Tarantini (born 3 December 1955) is an Argentine former professional footballer who played as a defender. He won the 1978 FIFA World Cup with the Argentina national football team. He played as a defensive left back early in his career, and later as a wing back.

Career
Born at Ezeiza, Tarantini rose through the Boca Juniors youth divisions in the early 1970s, and was noted for his afro hairdo and his large front teeth, which earned him the nickname conejo ("rabbit").

In 1977 with Boca Juniors he won his first international club football competition and one of the most prestigious tournaments in the world and the most prestigious club competition in Latin American football – Copa Libertadores, when after the goalless draw Boca defeated Cruzeiro 5–4 on penalties. The match was held at the Estadio Centenario in Montevideo, Uruguay on 14 September 1977.

Tarantini was part of the Argentina under-23 team that won the 1975 Toulon Tournament, together with Jorge Valdano, Américo Gallego, and others, with César Menotti as coach. He became the left-back of the Argentina national football team after Jorge Carrascosa left the team (the book El DT del Proceso by Gasparini and Ponsico claims that the wolf Carrascosa declined to play for the dictatorship). He was also, at 22, the youngest player of that team.

A few months before the 1978 FIFA World Cup, he had a contractual dispute with Boca that left him clubless, as Boca management pressured all Argentine clubs into denying him a new contract. After his performances during the World Cup (he scored a goal in the 6–0 victory against Peru, and played in the final against The Netherlands) he was signed by Birmingham City for £295,000. His spell in England was overshadowed by poor discipline, with Tarantini flattening Manchester United defender Brian Greenhoff, and ending his 23-game spell in Birmingham by wading into the crowd to punch a heckler.

After his return to Argentina he played for Talleres de Córdoba, River Plate, and European teams SC Bastia, Toulouse and FC St. Gallen.

In 1982 Tarantini was voted into the Top Ten of the South America Player of the Year awards.

Tarantini also played in the 1982 FIFA World Cup for Argentina, retiring from the national team immediately thereafter.

Personal life
Tarantini was married to fashion model Patricia Pata Villanueva. His brother George Tarantini is a former college soccer coach.

Honours

Club
Boca Juniors
Primera Division Argentina: Nacional 1976, Metropolitano 1976
Copa Libertadores: 1977

River Plate
Primera Division Argentina: Metropolitano 1980, Nacional 1981

International
Argentina
FIFA World Cup: 1978

Individual
FIFA World Cup All-Star Team: 1978
AFA Team of All Time (published 2015)

References

External links

 
 
 Tarantini at Sporting Heroes
  
 Top Ten South America Player of the Year 1982

1955 births
Living people
People from Ezeiza, Buenos Aires
Association football fullbacks
Argentine footballers
Boca Juniors footballers
Talleres de Córdoba footballers
Club Atlético River Plate footballers
English Football League players
Birmingham City F.C. players
SC Bastia players
Toulouse FC players
FC St. Gallen players
Ligue 1 players
FIFA World Cup-winning players
1978 FIFA World Cup players
1982 FIFA World Cup players
Expatriate footballers in England
Expatriate footballers in France
Expatriate footballers in Switzerland
Argentine expatriate sportspeople in France
Argentine expatriate sportspeople in England
Argentina international footballers
Argentine expatriate footballers
Argentine Primera División players
Argentine people of Italian descent
Sportspeople from Buenos Aires Province